"Lost" is a song by American band Maroon 5. It was released on June 11, 2021, through 222, Interscope, and Polydor Records as the fourth single from their seventh studio album, Jordi, along with the album. The band's lead singer, Adam Levine, wrote the song alongside the song's producers, the Monsters & Strangerz' group members, Eskeerdo, Jordan K. Johnson, and Stefan Johnson, alongside Jon Bellion, Michael Pollack, and Jacob Kasher Hindlin.

Background
On the deluxe edition of the album's track-by-track descriptions on Apple Music, Maroon 5's lead singer, Adam Levine, provided insight on the creation of "Lost":"Lost" is actually one of my favorites we've ever done. I think it just captures everything the band stands for, all in one song. Whether you liked us back then, whether you like us now, whether you'll like us later, I think this is kind of a classic sound that we've always had. And the song, the lyrics actually were a great process and I worked a lot. They took a while, and that's, to me, the most important contribution I think that I made to any record. Just sitting with them and really trying to make sure everybody understood what I was saying and not trying to shroud it too much in any metaphor.

"Lost" is a tropical house-pop song. It is a "spare, open-hearted ode to finding love in a lonely world". On May 5, 2021, when the band announced the Target edition of the album, the title of the song was revealed when fans could pre-order it.

Critical reception
Rolling Stone listed it among the worst songs of 2021, saying that it's "repetitive and dull" and "beyond forgettable". In a negative review of Jordi, Kate Solomon of i described both "Lost" and another track from the album, "Echo", featuring American singer-songwriter Blackbear, as possibly "the same song", explaining that "it is perfectly crafted to please crowds, to slip into your consciousness without you really realising - and if you find yourself buying a new car after listening, then its work here is probably done. Writing for NME, El Hunt reported that Maroon 5 tried to emulate the "eeriness" of American singer and songwriter Billie Eilish.

Live performances
On June 10, 2021, the day before Maroon 5 released "Lost" and Jordi, they performed the song, as well as another single from the album, "Beautiful Mistakes", a collaboration with American rapper Megan Thee Stallion, on The Late Show with Stephen Colbert. Although, while recording the album, the full band was not together in the same area, they came together for the performance.

Music video
The official music video premiered alongside the release of the song and album on June 11, 2021. Directed by Sophie Muller and shot in Malibu, California. The band members of Maroon 5 are seen performing the song on a beach. Lead singer Adam Levine is later pictured swimming underwater with his wife, Namibian model Behati Prinsloo Levine, who plays the role of a mermaid in the accompanying visuals.

Credits and personnel
Credits adapted from Tidal.

 Adam Levine – vocals, songwriting
 James Valentine – guitar
 The Monsters & Strangerz – production, vocal production, programming, songwriting
 Eskeerdo – production, vocal production, programming, songwriting
 Jordan K. Johnson – production, vocal production, programming, songwriting
 Stefan Johnson – production, vocal production, programming, songwriting
 Jon Bellion – background vocals, songwriting
 Michael Pollack – background vocals, songwriting
 Jacob Kasher Hindlin – songwriting
 Gian Stone – vocal production
 Noah "Mailbox" Passovoy – vocal production, recording, studio personnel
 Ashley Jacobson – assistant recording, studio personnel
 Eric Eylands – assistant recording, studio personnel
 Sam Schamburg – assistant recording, studio personnel
 John Hanes – engineering, studio personnel
 Serban Ghenea – mixing, engineering, studio personnel
 Randy Merrill – mastering, studio personnel

Charts

Weekly charts

Year-end charts

Release history

References

External links
 

2021 songs
2021 singles
Maroon 5 songs
Songs written by Adam Levine
Songs written by Jordan Johnson (songwriter)
Songs written by Stefan Johnson
Songs written by Michael Pollack (musician)
222 Records singles
Interscope Records singles
Polydor Records singles
Songs written by Eskeerdo
Songs written by Jon Bellion
Music videos directed by Sophie Muller